William Wyinks (11 September 1854 – 14 September 1921) was a New Zealand cricketer. He played two first-class matches for Otago between 1882 and 1886.

Wyinks worked for the New Zealand Land Transfer Department for 43 years until his death in Wellington at the age of 67, when he was Registrar General of Lands and Wellington District Land Registrar. He left a widow, four daughters and a son.

See also
 List of Otago representative cricketers

References

External links
 

1854 births
1921 deaths
New Zealand cricketers
Otago cricketers
People from Elgin, Moray
19th-century New Zealand public servants
20th-century New Zealand public servants
Sportspeople from Moray
Scottish emigrants to New Zealand
Scottish cricketers